The Stroud Half Marathon is an annual road running event held in Stroud, United Kingdom.

Past winners 

The men's race has been won three times by Paul Cuskin and Stuart Hall,. The women's race has been won five times by Bronwen Cardy-Wise.

References

External links
 Official website
 Results from Association of Road Running Statisticians

Half marathons in the United Kingdom
Recurring sporting events established in 1982
Sport in Gloucestershire
1982 establishments in England